Iran National Heritage List is a register of nationally significant monuments, places, buildings, events, etc., officially registered under the National Heritage Preservation Act of 1930. According to Article 1 of this law, "All the industrial monuments and buildings that were built up to the end of the Zand dynasty in the country of Iran, including movable and immovable in accordance with Article 13 of this law, can be considered as national heritage of Iran and under the protection and supervision of the state."

After 25 years, on February 1, 1956, with the registration of the Golestan Palace, the ban on the registration of works related to the Qajar was practically lifted and subsequently the official list of these monuments was published under the name current name.

History 

On November 12, 1930, with the approval of the Antiquities Act in the National Consultative Assembly, "all the works of ethnic groups who have lived on the territory of Persia until the end of the Zandieh era, are called antiques ... ." About two years, on November 19, 1932, the law went into effect. By then the Qajar items were not registered. On December 14, 1934 the new memorandum was legalized and thus the registry included the Qajar monuments.

André Godard, a French archaeologist, then an employee of National Museum of Iran, registered 385 items. By the end of Pahlavi dynasty, 1633 items were registered. The first series of these national heritage monuments was registered on September 16, 1931 and the first official monument is Soleyman Tappeh in Ilam.

After the Iranian Revolution of 1979, the Cultural Heritage, Handicrafts and Tourism Organization of Iran is responsible for maintaining and renovating the national heritage.

Criteria 
The heritage places are either tangible, intangible, intellectual or natural. There are five criteria:

(a) The item represents a period of national or international history with a high cultural and historical significance.

(b) The item, belongs to, or is related to, distinguished personalities of the country's history.

(c) The item has national or international significance representing a historical origin or milestone of human history.

(d) The item has national or international significance that contains comprehensive information about human history, culture, civilization, science, art or has had major impact in these areas.

(e) The item is respected and noteworthy by the general population.

List of Iran National Heritage No. 1 to 1000

List of Iran National Heritage No. 1001 to 2000

References 

Heritage registers
Cultural heritage of Iran